Clifford's theorem may refer to:
Clifford's theorem on special divisors
Clifford theory in representation theory
Hammersley–Clifford theorem in probability
Clifford's circle theorems in Euclidean geometry